Joel Monroe (1793–1877) was the man who gave Monroeville, Pennsylvania its name.

Biography
Monroe owned a farm that stretched from the Old Stone Church to the present-day Municipal Building, and it went northward into Garden City. Monroe purchased this farmland in 1829

By selling off small lots, he encouraged development along the Northern Turnpike.

In 1850, the farming community was highly developed, yet the mail was picked up in Turtle Creek.  Monroe went on to become Monroeville's first postmaster, a position he held from 1851 to 1855.  In 1855, he bought a farm in New Castle, Pennsylvania.  He went on to pass the farm to his daughter Rebecca Monroe Duff, who owned it along with her husband.

Marriage and children

Joel Monroe married Margaret Bing of Lawrence County, Pennsylvania on May 11, 1815. The couple had nine children: Sarah, Nancy, Rebecca, Margaret J., James M., Mary Ann, Joel, Priscilla and Lavenia.

Death and afterward
His wife perished in an 1864 house fire, and Joel passed away thirteen years later.  He is buried next to his wife at the Greenwood Cemetery in New Castle.

References

External links
 Monroeville Historical Society
 How Monroeville Got its Name

1793 births
1877 deaths
People from Monroeville, Pennsylvania